Ya with acute (Я́ я́; italics: Я́ я́) is a letter used in some East Slavic languages. It indicates a stressed Ya. For example, in Russian, it can be used in the word стоя́щий, meaning standing. However, in Russian, the acute accent is usually only used in dictionaries or children’s books.

References

Cyrillic letters with diacritics